The action of 14 February 1944 refers to the sinking of a German U-boat off the Strait of Malacca during World War II by a British submarine. It was one of the few naval engagements of the Asian and Pacific theater involving German and Italian forces.

Action
Following Italy's surrender to the Allies, a group of Italian submarines – including the Reginaldo Giuliani – were interned at Singapore by the occupying Japanese military on 10 September 1943. The Japanese turned the vessels over to the Kriegsmarine which operated several bases in southeast Asia. Reginaldo Giuliani had been converted to cargo service after being found unsatisfactory in an offensive role. The Kriegsmarine renamed her , and she sailed for France on 15 February 1944 under the command of Oberleutnant zur See Werner Striegler with a cargo of tin, quinine and other goods. Aboard UIT-23 were several Italian submariners who made up part of the boat's crew.

Tally-Ho was campaigning in the strait, where she sank several axis vessels. Bennington was also cruising on the surface, patrolling for Japanese shipping, when she sighted UIT-23 in the daytime. Tally-Ho attacked at full speed. Tally-Ho and UIT-23 were headed straight for one another when they both fired a spread of torpedoes.

Only Tally-Ho made hits, and UIT-23 quickly sank at position  with a loss of 26 men. Fourteen men went into the water where they remained for some time before being rescued by Japanese seaplanes and taken to Penang. The survivors were forced to strap themselves to the floats of the planes where they rode out the eighty miles back to base.

See also
Submarine warfare

References

 

Conflicts in 1944
Maritime incidents in February 1944
Strait of Malacca
A
Naval battles of World War II involving Germany
Naval battles of World War II involving Italy
Submarine warfare in World War II
Monsoon Group
February 1944 events
Germany–United Kingdom military relations